The common paradise kingfisher (Tanysiptera galatea), also known as the Galatea paradise kingfisher and the racquet-tailed kingfisher, is a species of bird in the family Alcedinidae. It is found in subtropical or tropical moist lowland forests of the Maluku Islands and New Guinea. Like all paradise kingfishers, it has a red bill and colourful plumage. The species is common and the IUCN has assessed its conservation status as being of "least concern".

Taxonomy
The common paradise kingfisher was first described  by the English zoologist George Robert Gray in 1859 based on specimens collected by Alfred Russel Wallace near "Dorey" (modern Manokwari in western New Guinea). Gray coined the current binomial name Tanysiptera galatea. The genus Tanysiptera had been introduced by the Irish zoologist Nicholas Aylward Vigors in 1825. The name Tanysiptera is from classical Greek tanusipteros meaning 'long-feathered'. The specific epithet galatea is from Greek mythology: Galatea was a sea nymph.

There are 15 recognised subspecies. Of these three occur on mainland New Guinea, 11 on the Maluku Islands to the west of New Guinea, and two on other islands.

 T. g. emiliae Sharpe, 1871 – Rau Island  (north Maluku Islands)
 T. g. doris Wallace, 1862 – Morotai  (north Maluku Islands)
 T. g. browningi Ripley, 1983 – Halmahera  (north Maluku Islands)
 T. g. brunhildae Jany, 1955 – Doi Island  (north Maluku Islands)
 T. g. margarethae Heine, 1860 – Bacan  (north Maluku Islands)
 T. g. sabrina Gray, GR, 1861 – Kayoa  (north Maluku Islands)
 T. g. obiensis Salvadori, 1877 – Obi Islands  (central Maluku Islands)
 T. g. acis Wallace, 1863 – Buru  (south Maluku Islands)
 T. g. boanensis Mees, 1964 – Boano (south Maluku Islands)
 T. g. nais Gray, GR, 1861 – Manipa, Ambon, Seram Island, Manawoka and Gorong  (south Maluku Islands)
 T. g. galatea Gray, GR, 1859 – northwest New Guinea and the west Raja Ampat Islands
 T. g. meyeri Salvadori, 1889 – north New Guinea
 T. g. minor Salvadori & D'Albertis, 1875 – south New Guinea
 T. g. vulcani Rothschild & Hartert, 1915 – Manam Island  (off northeast New Guinea)
 T. g. rosseliana Tristram, 1889 – Rossel Island  (east Louisiade Archipelago)

The Biak paradise kingfisher (Tanysiptera riedelii) and the Kofiau paradise kingfisher (Tanysiptera ellioti) have sometimes been considered as subspecies of the common paradise kingfisher.

Description 
This kingfisher has a red bill, a dark turquoise cap with brighter blue edges, blackish cheeks, and bluish-black upper parts. The under parts are white and the under-wing coverts are blue and white. The central tail feathers are elongated and their base is blue. It is similar in appearance to the buff-breasted paradise kingfisher (Tanysiptera sylvia) apart from the colour of the breast, and in some parts of Papua New Guinea, both birds coexist.

History

The bird is described in Alfred Russel Wallace's The Malay Archipelago (1869).

Distribution
The common paradise kingfisher is found in the forested interior of New Guinea and on some of the offshore islands to the north. On some islands it is replaced by sister species; the Biak paradise kingfisher (T. riedelii) on Biak Island; the Kofiau paradise kingfisher (T. ellioti) on Kofiau Island; and the Numfor paradise kingfisher (T. carolinae) on Numfor Island. It seems that each of these island species originated from founding T. galatea birds which became isolated from the mainland birds and underwent a "genetic revolution". There were no particular biotic factors involved, but there was sufficient variation among the founding birds to encourage speciation, and the assortment of genes that the birds on each island received was later undisturbed by the inflow of alien genes.

Ecology
This species is common and mostly non-migratory, although some birds move out of monsoon rainforest in the dry season. The nest is made in an active termite nest in a tree. They usually try several sites before selecting one. A clutch of about five eggs are laid between November and March and both parents care for the young.

The diet consists of such invertebrates as earthworms, grasshoppers, beetles, caterpillars, centipedes and snails, and occasionally lizards. The bird perches upright on a low branch, remaining stationary for long periods, apart from occasionally twisting its head or flicking its tail. On seeing movement below, it swoops to the forest floor to pounce, returning with its prey to the branch. The victim may be dismembered, or subdued by bashing it against the branch. Some insects are plucked off foliage, while earthworms are sought by foraging through the leaf litter and probing the leafmould with its beak.

Status
T. galatea has a very wide range and is reported to be common. The population trend for this bird is thought to be downward as logging takes place in its forest habitat, but the rate of decline is not great enough to cause concern and the International Union for Conservation of Nature has assessed its conservation status as being of "least concern".

References

common paradise kingfisher
Birds of the Maluku Islands
Birds of New Guinea
common paradise kingfisher
common paradise kingfisher
Taxonomy articles created by Polbot